Poshtaleh (also Romanized as Poshtāleh) is a village in Osmanvand Rural District, Firuzabad District, Kermanshah County, Kermanshah Province, Iran. At the 2006 census, its population was 30, in 6 families.

See also

Osmanvand Rural District

References 

Populated places in Kermanshah County